Frederick III James of Hesse-Homburg (19 May 1673, in Cölln – 8 June 1746, in 's-Hertogenbosch) was a Landgrave of Hesse-Homburg

Life 
Frederick III James was the second son of Landgrave Frederick II of Hesse-Homburg (1633–1708), the famous Prince of Homburg, from his marriage with Louise Elisabeth (1646–1690), daughter of the Duke Jacob of Courland (1610–1662).  He received a thorough education in the culturally and spiritually progressive atmosphere of the Electoral Court in Berlin, where his father served as commander of the Brandenburg troops,.

After his confirmation in 1687, he joined the Knight academy in Wolfenbüttel.  Later, he joined a Cavalry Regiment in Württemberg.  In 1690, he was Captain in the Dutch States Army; in 1692, he was Colonel of the Groningen cavalry regiment.  He kept being promoted: to Brigadier in 1701, to Major General in 1704 and after Battle of Blenheim on 13 August 1704, to Lieutenant General.  He remained  in the Dutch service until the Peace of Utrecht, and then took up government in Bad Homburg.

Frederick III could not contribute much to the administration of his territory while he was in Dutch service.  Worth mentioning, however, is the foundation in 1721 of the orphanage in Homburg, which still exists as a "Landgraviate Foundation".  The archives of the Foundation were transferred to the Bad Homburg city archives in August 2010.

Frederick's tolerant religious policies permitted the publication in Homburg of the book   ("A religious herbs-and-flower garden, or the universal song-book") by Christoph Schütz.

After the public debt in Hesse-Homburg had grown considerably, Frederick was forced by an imperial debit commission to again take service in The Netherlands in 1738.  He was governor of the Belgian city of Liège, then from 1741 governor of Breda.  In 1742, he was promoted to General of the Cavalry.

He died in 1746, as governor of 's-Hertogenbosch and was buried in the crypt of Bad Homburg Castle.  Since none of his children survived him, he was succeeded as the Landgrave of Hesse-Homburg by Frederick IV, the son of his younger brother Casimir William.

Marriages and Issue 
In Butzbach on 14 February 1700, Frederick III married firstly Elisabeth Dorothea of Hesse-Darmstadt (Darmstadt, 24 April 1676 - Homburg, 9 September 1721); she was the daughter of Louis VI, Landgrave of Hesse-Darmstadt. They had ten children:
Stillborn daughter (Homburg, 27 November 1700).
Fredericka Dorothea Sophia Ernestine (Groningen, 29 September 1701 - Homburg, 11 March 1704).
Frederick William Louis (Groningen, 1 November 1702 - Groningen, 19 August 1703).
Louise Wilhelmine Eleonore Franziska (Homburg, 2 December 1703 - Homburg, 20 August 1704).
Louis John William Gruno, Hereditary Prince of Hesse-Homburg (Homburg, 15 January 1705 - Berlin 13 October 1745), Russian Field Marshal, married on 3 February 1738 to Princess Anastasia Trubezkaya (14 October 1700 - St. Petersburg, 27 November 1755).
John Charles William Ernest Louis (Homburg, 24 August 1706 - Fellin, 10 May 1728).
Ernestine Louise Dorothea Charlotte (Homburg, 29 January 1707 - Homburg, 19 December 1707).
Stillborn son (Homburg, 17 February 1713).
Stillborn child (Homburg, 1716?).
Frederick Ulrich Louis (Homburg, 2 September 1721 - Homburg, 16 November 1721).

In Saarbrücken on 17 October 1728 Frederick III married secondly Christiane Charlotte of Nassau-Ottweiler (Ottweiler, 2 September 1685 - Homburg, 6 November 1761), widow of Count Charles Louis of Nassau-Saarbrücken. They had no children.

Ancestry

Notes

References 
 Johann Caspar Bluntschli: Deutsches Staatswörterbuch, p. 180
 Johann I. von Gerning: Die Lahn- und Main-Gegenden von Embs bis Frankfurt, p. 155
 Carl Eduard Vehse: Geschichte der deutschen Höfe seit der Reformation, p. 453

External links 
 Homepage des Kinderheims The Landgraviate Foundation

Landgraves of Hesse
House of Hesse-Homburg
1673 births
1746 deaths
17th-century German people
18th-century German people